Wilson Corner is an unincorporated community in Shelby and Washington townships, Shelby County, in the U.S. state of Indiana.

History
An old variant name of the community was called Wilson. A post office was established under this name in 1883, and remained in operation until it was discontinued in 1905. The community has the name of a family which kept a store there.

Geography

References

Unincorporated communities in Shelby County, Indiana
Unincorporated communities in Indiana